George Alexander (c. 1918 – October 7, 2011) was a Canadian football halfback who played for the Calgary Stampeders of the Canadian Football League. He played in all 16 regular season games from 1946 to 1947.

References 

Canadian football running backs
Calgary Stampeders players
1910s births
2011 deaths
Year of birth uncertain